CS Moulien is a football club in Guadeloupe, based in the town of Le Moule.

They play in Guadeloupe's first division, the Guadeloupe Championnat National.

Achievements
Guadeloupe Championnat National: 12
 1952–53, 1954–55, 1955–56, 1964–65, 1983–84, 1984–85, 1993–94, 2008–09, 2010–11, 2012–13, 2013–14, 2017–18

Coupe de Guadeloupe: 9
 1948, 1954, 1972, 1974, 2008, 2010, 2013, 2014, 2018

Ligue des Antilles: 2
 1947, 1955

Performance in CONCACAF competitions
CONCACAF Champions Cup: 3 appearances
1985 – Third round (Caribbean Zone) – Lost against  Defence Force
1986 – Second round (Caribbean Zone) – Lost against  Trintoc
1995 – Final Tournament – 4th and last in the group

External links
 Tour des clubs 2008–2009 – Gwadafoot 
 Club info – French Football Federation 
 Official site

 
Moulien